Pauline de Lassus Saint-Geniès (born 9 April 1983 in Paris), better known by her stage name Mina Tindle, is a French folk and new wave singer, songwriter and multi-instrumentalist. She released her debut EP with Sauvage Records, and in March 2012 released her debut album Taranta on Believe Recordings.

De Lassus was born in Paris and has family that reside in Spain. She lived in Brooklyn where she played with the band The Limes before returning to Paris to pursue her career as a solo artist. She is married to The National member Bryce Dessner and has provided vocals on several of their albums.

Discography

Albums

Singles

References

External links
 
 Melanie McGovern's 2012 interview

1983 births
Living people
French multi-instrumentalists
French singer-songwriters
Musicians from Paris
21st-century French singers